South China Normal University (SCNU) is a comprehensive university that is part of Double First Class University Plan and Project 211 in Guangzhou, capital of Guangdong province, in the People's Republic of China. It is a Chinese state Double First Class University identified by the Ministry of Education. The university is featured distinctively by both teaching and research, consisting of diverse branches of learning such as philosophy, economics, law, education, literature, history, science, technology, and management. There is also an elementary school in this university.

Motto 
For more than 80 years, the school has changed its name and moved several times. Although it has gone through vicissitudes of life, it has never stopped. Generations of Chinese teachers have inherited the fine tradition of "researching advanced academics and nurturing professional talents in the society" of the Teachers' College of Mengqin University, and inherited Southern University's revolutionary spirit of "loyalty, unity, simplicity and humility, hardworking and courage, seeking truth from facts", and practiced it The school motto of arduous struggle, rigorous academic research, truth-seeking and innovation, and being a good example of others" has been passed down from generation to generation, and has jointly created the prosperity and development of the university today.

History

Location and campus 
The university has three campuses:
 Main campus (Shipai campus), Tianhe District, Guangzhou, Guangdong
 HEMC (Guangzhou Higher Education Mega Center) campus, Panyu District, Guangzhou, Guangdong
 Nanhai campus, Nanhai District, Foshan, Guangdong
 Shanwei campus, Chengqu district, Shanwei, Guangdong

Administration 
South China Normal University (SCNU) was founded in 1933, before which it was named Guangdong Provincial Teacher's College of Xiangqin University. It became a member of Project 211 in 1996, after which it was constructed and supported by People's Government and Ministry of Education in Guangdong Province in 2015. In 2017, SCNU became a member of the country's "State Double First Class University Plan". South China Normal University provides a variety of subjects, including philosophy, economics, law, education, literature, history, science, technology, agriculture, medical, management and art.

South China Normal University has more than 30 schools and colleges, and offers 84 undergraduate programs, over 200 graduate programs, and over 100 doctoral programs. In 2017, there were 24,894 undergraduates, 7553 postgraduates and 842 doctoral candidates. There are approximately 1000 long-term international students from more than 100 countries every year.

The university has a group of highly qualified experts, professors and teachers. There are now 1979 full-time teachers, among which more than a half are postgraduates' tutors and doctoral supervisors. At present, SCNU has dozens of State Key Laboratory and engineering research centers.

The current president is Dr. Wang Enke.

Academics

Schools and Departments

Shipai Campus 
 School of Education
 School of Politics & Administration
 School of Marxism
 School of History & Culture
 School of Foreign Studies
 School of Special Education
 College of International Culture
 School of Fine Arts
 School of Tourism Management
 School of Information Technology in Education
 School of Mathematical Sciences
 School of Life Sciences
 School of Geography
 School of Computer
 School of Psychology
 College of Continuing Education
 School of Internet Education
 Phoenix International School
 Institute of Optoelectronic Materials and Technology
 College of Biophotonics
 School of Professional Development and Research on Primary and Secondary Education
 Institute for Brain Research and Rehabilitation
 South China Research Center for Applied Mathematics and Interdisciplinary Studies

HEMC Campus 
 School of Literature
 School of Economics& Management
 School of Law
 School of Politics and Public Administration
 School of physical education & sports science
 School of Music
 School of Physics and Telecommunications Engineering
 School of Chemistry 
 School of Tourism Management 
 School of Information and Optoelectronic Science and Engineering 
 South China Academy of Advanced Optoelectronics
 Institute of Quantum Matter 
 Academy of Front-line Physics Science(物理前沿科学研究院)No official translation.
 School of Environment 
 Academy of Environment
 Department of Physics(物理学部)No official translation.
 School of Entrepreneurship
 Institute for Science, Technology and Society 
 South China Nuclear Science Computing Center(南方核科学计算中心)No official translation. 
 Academy of Future Technology(未来科技研究院)No official translation.

Nanhai Campus 
 School of Urban Culture
 International Business College
 School of Software
 College of Vocational and Technical Education
 College of Nanhai

Shanwei Campus 
 Xingzhi College
 School of Data Science and Engineering 
 Department of General Education, Shanwei Campus
 School of Meterials and New Energy 
 College of Vocational and Technical Education 
 School of Basic Education 
 School of Business 
 School of Creative Design

Teaching and Auxiliary Departments 
 Network Center
 Research Resources Center
 Journal of South China Normal University
 Archives of SCNU 
 Libraries of SCNU
 Center of Teachers’ Learning and Development
 Center of Education and Development

Affiliated Departments 
 South China Normal University Hospital
 The Affiliated Kindergarten of South China Normal University
 The Affiliated High School of SCNU
 The Affiliated Primary School of SCNU

South China university libraries 
There are the multi-functional libraries on three campuses with more than 3.74 million books.
 Shipai campus:
Built in 1998, Shipai campus library has an area of 29 thousand square meters. It has around 1.83 million books and 1700 reading seats.
 HEMC campus:
Built up in 2004, HEMC campus library has an area of 39 thousand square meters. It has around 1.12 million books and 1800 reading seats.
 Nanhai campus: 
Built up in 2002, Nanhai campus library has an area of 14 thousand square meters. It has around 0.61 million books and 1100 reading seats.

Student life

Student associations 
South China University has more than 120 student associations covering five domains: theory and study, society and practice, academic and science technology, entertainment and sport, interest and hobby. To name a few: Student Association of English, Student Association of Psychology, Student Association of Huayun Han Chinese Clothing, Literature Association of Hai Pengzi, Martial Art Association, Guitar Association, etc.

Canteens

Shipai Campus 
 Tao Yuan(In Chinese:陶园)
 Yong Yuan(In Chinese:雍园)
 Qin Yuan(In Chinese:沁园)

HEMC Campus 
 Han Yuan(In Chinese:翰园)
 Nan Yuan(In Chinese:楠园)

Nanhai Campus 
 Xi Yuan(In Chinese:熹园)(It was changed its name into Xi Yuan in 2017)

References

External links 
 South China Normal University Official webpage 
 3D map 

 
Teachers colleges in China
Educational institutions established in 1933
Universities and colleges in Guangzhou
Guangzhou Higher Education Mega Center
Tianhe District
1933 establishments in China